Gavril Both (6 September 1947 - 17 April 2017) was a Romanian football forward and manager.

Honours

Player
Olimpia Satu Mare
Divizia C: 1968–69
Divizia B: 1973–74, 1976–77
Cupa României runner-up: 1977–78
Dinamo București
Divizia A: 1970–71
Cupa României runner-up: 1969–70

Manager
Olimpia Satu Mare
Divizia B: 1997–98

References

External links

Manager profile at Labtof

1947 births
2017 deaths
Romanian footballers
Association football forwards
Liga I players
Liga II players
FC UTA Arad players
FC Olimpia Satu Mare players
FC Dinamo București players
Romanian football managers
FC Olimpia Satu Mare managers
Sportspeople from Satu Mare